Chrysophila atridorsalis is a species of snout moth. It was described by Émile Louis Ragonot in 1891. It is found in the Brazilian state of Espirito Santo.

References

Moths described in 1891
Chrysauginae